Jules Alexis "Louis" Zutter (2 December 1865 – 10 November 1946) was a Swiss gymnast.  He competed at the 1896 Summer Olympics in Athens.

Zutter won one of the events, the pommel horse.  He was also the runner-up in two more events, the vault and the parallel bars.  In addition, he competed in the horizontal bar event, but without success.

He was born in Les Ponts-de-Martel and lived in Peseux, where he was a member of the gymnastics club La Société des Amis gymnastes de Neuchâtel. In 1893 his father was hired as a trainer in Panachaikos Gymnastikos Syllogos and Louis became a member of the club. After his success in the 1896 Olympics, he was honoured in Patras with the Greek athletes by the city. The Zutter family left Greece due to the Greco-Turkish War (1897).

References

External links 

  (Excerpt available at )

1856 births
1946 deaths
Gymnasts at the 1896 Summer Olympics
19th-century sportsmen
Swiss male artistic gymnasts
Olympic gold medalists for Switzerland
Olympic silver medalists for Switzerland
Olympic medalists in gymnastics
Medalists at the 1896 Summer Olympics
People from Neuchâtel